Lover/Fighter is an album by Canadian artist Hawksley Workman, released in 2003. The album debuted at #33 on the Canadian Albums Chart.

Track list disc: 1 
 "We Will Still Need a Song" – 3:50
 "Even An Ugly Man" – 4:46
 "Wonderful and Sad" – 3:51
 "Anger as Beauty" – 5:43
 "No Reason to Cry Out Your Eyes (On the Highway Tonight)" – 3:16
 "Tonight Romanticize the Automobile" – 4:29
 "The Future Language of Slaves" – 6:19
 "Smoke Baby" – 6:08
 "Autumn's Here" – 4:59
 "Ilfracombe" – 5:06 (Bonus Track)
 "Addicted" – 5:13 (Bonus Track)
 "A Knife in the Country (Edit)" – 4:46
 European Bonus Track Only
 "Lust" – 8:22
 European Bonus Track Only
 "Where It Used to Snow" – 3:17
 European Bonus Track Only

Track list disc: 2 
 "Jealous of Your Cigarette" (Video - live)
 "Your Beauty Must be Rubbing Off" (Video - live)
 "The Making of Lover/Fighter" (Video)

References

2003 albums
Hawksley Workman albums